Margaret Osborne may refer to:

 Margaret Osborne (actress) (fl. 1671-1691), English stage actress of the 17th century
 Margaret Osborne (table tennis) (1913-1987), English table tennis player
 Margaret Osborne duPont (1918–2012), née Margaret Osborne, US tennis player
 Maggie Osborne (born 1941), American author with work nominated for RITA Award
 Margaret Osborn (born 1988), better known as Alice Glass, Canadian singer and songwriter